Newtown (formerly, New town) is a small unincorporated community in El Dorado County, California, United States. The ZIP code is 95667. The community is inside area code 530.

A post office operated at Newtown from 1854 to 1912, with a closure in 1875.

Notable residents have included John Augustus Raffetto, father of radio star Michael Raffetto.  The Raffetto home is now a bed and breakfast and offers a room in the name of that family.

References

Unincorporated communities in California
Unincorporated communities in El Dorado County, California